= 1910–11 NC State Wolfpack men's basketball team =

American college basketball season

1910–11 NC State Wolfpack men's basketball
- Conference: Independent
- Record: 1–1
- Head coach: Piggy Hargrove (1st season)
- Captain: Piggy Hargrove

The 1910–11 NC State Wolfpack men's basketball team represented North Carolina State University during the 1910–11 college men's basketball season.

== Schedule ==
Date time, TV	Opponent	Result	Record	Site city, state
*	Wake Forest	L 6–33	0–1	Raleigh, NC
*	Wake Forest	W 19–18	1–1	Raleigh, NC
*Non-conference game. (#) Tournament seedings in parentheses.
